Canada was launched at King's Yard in 1779 for the Royal Navy, which sold her circa 1782 at the end of the war. Her name while in Royal Navy service is unknown as of November 2022. John St Barbe purchased her and named her Adriatic, but renamed her Canada circa 1786. She made three seal hunting and whaling voyages between 1791 and 1799 under that name. On the first of these a French privateer captured her, but a British merchant ship recaptured her. She was lost at South Georgia in 1800 on her fourth voyage to the southern whale fishery.

Career
Adriatic entered Lloyd's Register in 1783. Her master was K. St Barbe and her trade was London-Ancona. In 1786 her master was Cole, her name changed to Canada, and her trade became London-Quebec.

1st whaling voyage: Captain Alexander Muirhead left Britain on 15 July 1791. However, Prince of Wales, of Greenock, recaptured Canada and took her into Greenock. Muirhead then sailed her to Gravesend, Kent, arriving there on 28 October 1793. He returnedwith 15 tuns of sperm oil, seven tuns of whale oil, and 7000 seal skins.

Smyrna trade: Lloyd's Register for 1794 showed Canada, still with Muirhead, master, changing her trade from London-South Seas to London-Smyrna. This entry continued until 1797 when J. Cundall replaces Muirhead and her trade became London-Jamaica.

2nd whaling voyage: In 1798 Canadas owner changed from J. Cundall to J. Hill, and her master from J. Cundall to J. French. Her trade changed from London-Jamaica to London—South Seas. Also, her armament increased. Captain John French received a letter of marque on 11 June 1798. He left Britain on 25 June  for South Georgia, and returned on 16 July 1799.

Loss
Canada, Captain Lewis Llewellyn, left Britain on 2 September 1799, bound for South Georgia.<ref>[https://hdl.handle.net/2027/mdp.39015004281260?urlappend=%3Bseq=57 Lloyd's Register (1799), Seq. №C26.]</ref> Canada  arrived around March and was lost soon after. The location of her wreck is unknown. On 6 June 1800 Lloyd's List reported Canada'', French, master, lost at South Georgia.

Notes

Citations

References
 
 
 
 
 

1779 ships
Ships built in England
Captured ships
Sealing ships
Whaling ships
Maritime incidents in 1800
Age of Sail merchant ships
Merchant ships of the United Kingdom
Shipwrecks in the Southern Ocean